The Sonoran–Sinaloan transition subtropical dry forest is a tropical dry broadleaf forest ecoregion in northwestern Mexico.

Geography
This ecoregion forms a transition belt between the Sonoran Desert to the north and the Sinaloan dry forests to the south, running south from the foothills of the Sierra Madre Occidental highlands of the state of Sonora to the Pacific Ocean coasts of Sonora and Sinaloa. This region is also part of the transition zone between the Nearctic and Neotropical realms and as such habitats of the region range from sparse semi-desert in the north to dry forest in the south.

Climate
The climate is subtropical and semi-arid.

Flora
The characteristic vegetation is deciduous thorn forest and woodland ("selva espinosa"), with areas of thorn scrub. Characteristic trees include the boat-thorn acacia (Acacia cochliacantha), tree catclaw  (Acacia occidentalis), torote prieto (Bursera fragilis), and palo santo (Ipomoea arborescens). Cacti are common, including organ pipe cactus (Stenocereus thurberi), jumping cholla (Cylindropuntia fulgida) and barrel cactus (Ferocactus wislizeni).

Fauna
Large mammals include white-tailed deer (Odocoileus virginianus), javelina (Dicotyles tajacu), jaguar (Panthera onca), and coyote (Canis latrans).

As in the Sonoran Desert, nectar-feeding long-tongued bats like the Mexican long-tongued bat (Choeronycteris mexicana) and Pallas's long-tongued bat (Glossophaga soricina) are important pollinators. The ecoregion has over 90 species of butterflies.

Birds of the ecoregion include the black-throated magpie-jay (Calocitta colliei).

Threats and preservation
This woodland is vulnerable to logging and clearance for livestock grazing, particularly around the cities of Navojoa, Álamos, and Sinaloa de Leyva. While the wildlife is vulnerable to hunting. Areas of particular conservation importance include the Yaqui River basin.

A 2017 assessment found that 2,029 km2, or 4%, of the ecoregion is in protected areas. 13% of the unprotected area is relatively-intact habitat.

See also
 List of ecoregions in Mexico

References

External links

 
Ecoregions of Mexico
Forests of Mexico
Natural history of Sinaloa
Natural history of Sonora
Sierra Madre Occidental
Nearctic ecoregions
Tropical and subtropical dry broadleaf forests
Sclerophyll forests